Písečná is name of several locations in the Czech Republic:

 Písečná (Frýdek-Místek District), a village in Moravian-Silesian Region (Frýdek-Místek District)
 Písečná (Jeseník District)
  Písečná (Ústí nad Orlicí District)